Captain Lightfoot is a 1955 American CinemaScope Technicolor adventure film directed by Douglas Sirk starring Rock Hudson, Barbara Rush and Jeff Morrow and is Sirk's adaptation of a book by W. R. Burnett written in 1954.

The movie is set in the early 19th century with the hero and his brother-in-arms becoming highwaymen, robbing the wealthy around the foothills of Dublin, Ireland. Captain Lightfoot falls in love, and the ensuing drama threatens everyone's safety.

The movie was filmed around Clogherhead, County Louth, and in the Powerscourt Estate in Enniskerry, County Wicklow. Slane Castle in Slane Co. Meath was used as the exterior of Ballymore Castle

Plot
In 1815, Michael Martin, member of an Irish revolutionary society, turns highwayman to support it, and soon becomes an outlaw. In Dublin, he meets famous rebel "Captain Thunderbolt" and becomes his second-in-command, under the name "Lightfoot."

Cast
 Rock Hudson  as Michael Martin, aka "Lightfoot"
 Barbara Rush  as Aga Doherty
 Jeff Morrow  as John Doherty, aka "Capt. Thunderbolt"
 Kathleen Ryan  as Lady Anne More
 Finlay Currie  as Callahan
 Denis O'Dea  as Regis Donnell
 Geoffrey Toone  as Captain Hood
 Hilton Edwards  as Lord Glen
 Sheila Brennan  as Waitress
 Harry Goldblatt  as Brady
 Charles B. Fitzsimons  as Dan Shanley
 Christopher Casson  as Lord Clonmell
 Philip O'Flynn  as Trim

See also
List of American films of 1955

References
 Tony Tracy, "Captain Lightfoot (1955): Caught between a Rock (Hudson) and a Rapparee," Screening Irish America (ed. Ruth Barton), (Dublin: Irish Academic Press, 2009)

External links
 

1955 films
1950s adventure drama films
American historical adventure films
Films directed by Douglas Sirk
Films scored by Heinz Roemheld
Films scored by Herman Stein
1950s historical adventure films
Films set in the 1810s
Films based on American novels
Films based on works by W. R. Burnett
Films produced by Ross Hunter
Films shot in Ireland
Films set in Ireland
American adventure drama films
Universal Pictures films
CinemaScope films
1955 drama films
1950s English-language films
1950s American films